Jurek Stasiak (born 23 April 1978) is a former professional tennis player from Australia.

Biography
Born in Gdańsk, Stasiak emigrated from Poland to Australia with his family in 1985. He grew up in Parramatta and started playing tennis at the age of nine, along with his identical twin brother Wojtek. The brothers were coached by their father Bogdan and became highly ranked Australian juniors, featuring together in the Junior Davis Cup in 1994.

Stasiak, a right-handed player, began playing Challenger tournaments in 1996. He took part in the qualifying draw for the Australian Open for three years without success before being granted a wildcard spot into the 1998 Australian Open. In the first round he lost a five-set match to American Vince Spadea. Later in the year he represented the Poland Davis Cup team in ties against Senegal and Egypt.

His brother Wojtek went missing in 2001, aged 23. He left the family home and hasn't been seen since. After he went missing, posters were put up in the local area, which prompted people to report sightings, not realising they had instead spotted his identical twin. In 2008 Wojtek was declared deceased by a NSW coroner.

See also
List of Poland Davis Cup team representatives

References

External links
 
 
 

1978 births
Living people
Australian male tennis players
Polish male tennis players
Sportspeople from Gdańsk
Polish emigrants to Australia
Identical twins
Australian twins
Twin sportspeople
Tennis people from New South Wales